In Colorado, State Highway 87 may refer to:
U.S. Route 87 in Colorado, the only Colorado highway numbered 87 since 1968
Colorado State Highway 87 (1923-1968) south of Denver, now part of SH 75